General Armstrong was an American brig built for privateering. General Armstrong may also refer to:

Bertram Armstrong (1893–1972), South African Army major general
Bigoe Armstrong (1717–1794), British Army general
Clare Hibbs Armstrong (1894–1969), U.S. Army brigadier general
Donald Armstrong (1889–1984), U.S. Army brigadier general
Frank A. Armstrong (1902–1969), U.S. Air Force lieutenant general
Frank Crawford Armstrong (1835–1909), Confederate States Army brigadier general
Harry George Armstrong (1899–1983), U.S. Air Force major general
John Armstrong (British Army officer) (1674–1742), British Army major general
John Armstrong Jr. (1758–1843), U.S. Army brigadier general
John Armstrong Sr. (1717–1795), Continental Army brigadier general and Pennsylvania Militia major general in the American Revolutionary War
Raymond Armstrong (1917–1990s), South African Air Force lieutenant general
Richard Armstrong (British Army officer) (c. 1782–1854), British Army lieutenant general
Spence M. Armstrong (born 1934), U.S. Air Force lieutenant general

See also
Attorney General Armstrong (disambiguation)